Alan Kennedy (born 1986 in Glanmire, County Cork) is an Irish sportsperson.  He plays hurling with his local club Sarsfields  and has been a member of the Cork senior inter-county team since 2009 when he was called up due to the 2008-2009 Cork Hurlers strike.

References

1987 births
Living people
Sarsfields (Cork) hurlers
Cork inter-county hurlers
Hurling goalkeepers